Pittawat Thongpang is a Thai footballer. He plays for Thailand Premier League clubside Samut Songkhram FC.

References

1981 births
Living people
Pittawat Thongpang
Association football midfielders
Pittawat Thongpang
Pittawat Thongpang